Images at Twilight is the second studio album by the Canadian progressive rock band Saga and was originally released in May 1979. It introduces the vocoder keyboard as an important instrument in Saga's development. It is also the only album to feature keyboardist Gregg Chadd who had replaced original keyboardist Peter Rochon.

Live performances
"You're Not Alone" remains a fixed part of Saga's live set, and is notable in part for the frequent audience participation during certain passages. Vocalist Michael Sadler typically divides the crowd by gender or section, and the different sections take turns singing "You're not, you're not, you're not alone." The song is featured on all the band's official live releases. A remake titled "You're Not Alone '97" (keeping only the chorus and instrumental parts) was included on the album Pleasure & the Pain. "Mouse in a Maze" returned to the setlist in 2012, appearing on Spin It Again! Live in Munich, and the Special Edition of Sagacity (2014). Both performances omit the a cappella intro and start with the main guitar riff.  It is also on the Limited Edition of All Areas - Live in Bonn 2002 (2004), along with "Images (Chapter One)".

"It's Time! (Chapter Three)" and "Images (Chapter One)" are featured on The Chapters Live (recorded in 2003 and released in 2005). "See Them Smile" can be found on All Areas - Live in Bonn 2002 (2004) and Worlds Apart Revisited (2007). "Take It or Leave it" is also on All Areas - Live in Bonn. "Hot to Cold" is available on Live in Hamburg (2016). From the album, only "Slow Motion" was never played live.

The Chapters
Two of the songs, "Images (Chapter One)" and "It's Time (Chapter Three)" were part of a series of eight (but later sixteen) songs that Saga included within their first four albums called "The Chapters", which told the story of a young Albert Einstein. To date, there's been no official compilation of the chapters in their studio incarnation.

Track listing 
All credits adapted from the original release.

Personnel
Saga
 Michael Sadler – lead vocals, keyboards, Moog synthesizer, bass guitar on "It's Time!"
 Ian Crichton –  electric and acoustic guitars
 Gregg Chadd – keyboards, backing vocals, Moog synthesizer, vocoder
 Jim Crichton – bass guitar, Moog Taurus bass synthesizer
 Steve Negus – drums, percussion

Production
 Paul Gross – producer
 Alan Thorne, Mick Walsh – recording engineers
 Mark Wright – re-mixing engineer
 Jeff Stobbs, Robin Brouwers – re-mixing engineer assistants
 Zoran Busic – album graphic concept and design 
 Cover illustration by Tony Roberts, Young Artists, London, England

References

External links 
 Saga - Images at Twilight (1979) album credits & user reviews at ProgArchives.com
 
 Saga - Images at Twilight (1979) album to be listened on Spotify

1979 albums
Saga (band) albums
Polydor Records albums